kha Nganpa or Kha Nganba (modern term) is one of the seven clans of the Meitei people.

See also
Mangang
Luwang
Khuman
Angom
Moilang
Salai Leishangthem

References

External links
 Wakoklon Heelel Thilel Salai Amailon Pukok PuYa

Clans of Meitei